Sannikovo is a rural locality (a selo) in Klyazminskoye Rural Settlement, Kovrovsky District, Vladimir Oblast, Russia. The population was 352 as of 2010. There are 3 streets.

Geography 
Sannikovo is located 32 km northeast of Kovrov (the district's administrative centre) by road. Dushkino is the nearest rural locality.

References 

Rural localities in Kovrovsky District